Kickboxer: Retaliation is an American martial arts film directed and written by Dimitri Logothetis. It is the seventh in the Kickboxer film series and a direct sequel to the 2016 film Kickboxer: Vengeance, also written by Logothetis. The film stars Alain Moussi, Jean-Claude Van Damme, Christopher Lambert, Ronaldinho, Mike Tyson, and Hafþór Júlíus Björnsson. Aside from Moussi and Van Damme, Sara Malakul Lane and Sam Medina reprised their roles from the previous film.

Plot
It has been eighteen months since Kurt Sloane killed Tong Po and avenged the death of his brother Eric. Now a professional mixed martial artist, Kurt defeats Renato Sobral using a move he calls the "Hurricane Armbar", a hurricanrana into an armbar. Kurt has been plagued by nightmares where he and his wife Liu are on a train and he finds himself fighting on the train which ends with him falling into water and possibly drowning. After the fight, Kurt is met by two U.S. Marshals who inform him that he must return to Thailand to be implicated in the death of Tong Po. When Kurt asks to see one of the Marshal's badges, he is tasered.

Awakening in a prison in Thailand, Kurt meets Thomas Tang Moore, the mastermind behind the underground tournament where Kurt, Eric, and Tong Po have competed. Moore tells Kurt that when Tong Po was defeated, he was to remain there as the new champion, but instead with Kurt returning home, Moore needed to find a new champion. Moore offers Kurt to fight the new champion, Mongkut, a 6'8" 400-lb. fighter. Kurt finds himself taunted by Crawford, Tong Po's former right-hand man who is working for Moore. Moore offers Kurt $1 million to fight Mongkut, but Kurt refuses. Stuck in prison, Kurt finds himself under constant threat from various prisoners, in which he then finds himself whipped by the prison guards each night. During one encounter, Kurt runs into Briggs, an American boxer who soon bonds with Kurt and even offers him a way to go through the pain from the whippings. Kurt also soon learns that his Muay Thai teacher, Durand, is now training some of the prisoners, but reveals that for his troubles, he has been blinded.

Moore, realizing Kurt still will not accept the offer, decides to take drastic measures and finds Liu at the train station. Having bribed the same police officers she had accused of corruption to find Kurt, she gets additional help from old friend Gamon. However, Moore's goons, led by Somsak, have kidnapped Liu and that night, Crawford shows Kurt a video of Liu. Kurt decides to take the fight with Durand, Briggs, and fellow prisoners Big Country, Fabricio, Ronaldo, and a huge convict whose size nearly matches that of Mongkut. When Moore offers to take Kurt out of prison and in a private facility, Kurt agrees but only if his "team" continues their training and Moore agrees. Durand goes to one of Mongkut's training sessions only to learn the fighter is a product of bioengineering by Ivy League graduate Rupert, who has developed a combination of adrenaline and steroids, thus making Mongkut virtually invincible except for one small weakness: a glass jaw. Gamon joins in on the training and Kurt recognizes Somsak. Moore talks to Crawford about a test fight, to which Moore agrees and Kurt goes to a local nightclub where he and Durand once again meet Joseph King, whose last fighter decimated Kurt. Kurt faces King's new champion Moss while Durand distracts an onlooker and steals his cell phone to call his son Travis. Kurt defeats Moss and make a narrow escape with the help of Travis.

The next day, Kurt finds Somsak and chases him. After fighting more of Moore's men, Kurt catches up to Somsak and demands to know where Liu is. Liu is being held in Moore's apartment. Kurt, Gamon, and Travis take on Moore's men with Kurt facing Moore's two female valets in a room full of mirrors only to defeat them, finding Liu and rescuing her. When O'Keefe, Moore's right-hand man, leads an ambush to stop the group, Mongkut arrives. He is about to hit Kurt when Liu steps in and Mongkut hits her hard in the stomach, knocking her unconscious. An angry Kurt tells Crawford to tell Moore he will face Mongkut anytime and anywhere. Liu is comatose in the hospital for a few days until she wakes up and learns Kurt has taken the fight. She fully accepts his decision.

The fight is set at the old Muay Thai temple with both Kurt and Mongkut ready to fight. Mongkut proves to be too much for Kurt and mid-way through, Mongkut throws Kurt to a statue, virtually killing him. When it is believed that Kurt has died from his injuries, Liu finds Rupert's suitcase of adrenaline and uses a needle to revive Kurt. Awakening, Kurt finds a second wind and despite getting some of the upper hand, Mongkut once again throws Kurt towards a statue and this time, takes him to a nearby fountain to drown him. Kurt imagines himself once again drowning as he did in his dream, but overhears the voices of Liu and Durand, prompting him to "swim out". Kurt grabs a chain and wraps it around his fist, enabling him to match Mongkut punch for punch. Using his skills, Kurt gets the upper hand and knocks Mongkut down. When Mongkut comes back up, Kurt resorts to taking Mongkut down with the chain, wrapping it around his neck and choking him out, resulting in Mongkut's neck breaking. Kurt has won and is surrounded by Durand, Liu, Gamon, and Travis. Hearing the news that Kurt has beaten Mongkut, Briggs is seen smiling in his prison cell.

An end credit sequence shows outtakes, following by an epilogue of Kurt once again in the MMA ring as he prepares for his next fight against Mauricio Rua.

Cast and characters
 Alain Moussi as Kurt Sloane
 Jean-Claude Van Damme as Master Durand
 Hafþór Júlíus Björnsson as Mongkut
 Mike Tyson as Briggs
 Sara Malakul Lane as Liu Sloane
 Christopher Lambert as Thomas Moore
 Steven Swadling as Joseph King
 Sam Medina as Crawford
 Miles Strommen as Rupert
 Randy Charach as Drake
 James P. Bennett as nunchaku man
 Brian Shaw as huge convict
 Roy Nelson as "Big Country"
 Ronaldinho as Ronaldo
 Fabricio Werdum as Fabricio
 Jessica Jann as Gamon
 Maxime Savaria as Somsak
 Nicholas Van Varenberg as Travis
 Wanderlei Silva as Chud
 Rico Verhoeven as Moss
 Renato Sobral as himself
 Renzo Gracie as himself
 Frankie Edgar as himself
 Maurício Rua as himself
 Jazz Securo as fight announcer
 Kevin Lee as Hafþór Júlíus Björnsson's stunt double

Production
Headmon Entertainment and Acme Rocket Fuel announced the sequel to the film Kickboxer: Vengeance, titled Kickboxer 2: Retaliation. Rob Hickman produced the film through Our House Productions along with Dimitri Logothetis through Acme Rocket Fuel and executive produced by Steven Swadling and Larry Nealy. The film was retitled Kickboxer: Retaliation, began pre-production in February 2016, and Dimitri Logothetis was film's director and writer, while Hafþór Júlíus Björnsson was cast to play the role of a fighter. Ultimate Fighting Championship's Paige VanZant was cast in the film to make her feature debut, with other cast returning: Alain Moussi, Jean-Claude Van Damme, Sara Malakul Lane, Sam Medina, and Steven Swadling. Former world champion boxer Mike Tyson played a tough convict forced into a world of fighting behind bars.

UFC fighter Paige VanZant, who was set to make her film debut in the film as "Gamon", left the project to focus on an then-upcoming fight. Jessica Jann replaced her in the role. Originally a small role in the film, UFC fighter Roy "Big Country" Nelson's role was expanded. Christopher Lambert joined the cast as Thomas Moore, an ex-pat and martial artist who is the one responsible for coercing Kurt to face Mongkut.

Principal photography on the film began in mid-May 2016, in California and Nevada, and in Bangkok, Thailand in July.

Release
Well Go USA Entertainment released the film in a limited theatrical release and on Demand platforms on January 26, 2018, and later on Blu-ray and DVD on March 13.

Critical response
On Metacritic, the film has a weighted average score of 54 out of 100, based on 5 critics, indicating "mixed or average reviews".

Simon Abrams for RogerEbert.com called it a "very dumb, and very satisfying throwback to a simpler time when American action films were as predictable as they were formulaic". John DeFore of The Hollywood Reporter wrote: "A pulpy and fun fight flick that is better in some respects than it needs to be, Retaliation may not do for Moussi what the original Kickboxer did for Van Damme, but it won't send fans home disappointed".

Sequel
Producer Rob Hickman announced the name of the third and final installment of the trilogy as Kickboxer: Syndicate. It was later renamed Kickboxer: Armageddon and was set to begin production in 2018. Alain Moussi, James P. Bennett and Brazilian footballer Neymar will star, and Conor McGregor was rumored to also appear in the film.

References

External links
 
 

2018 films
American martial arts films
American films about revenge
Kickboxer (film series)
Films set in Bangkok
Films shot in Thailand
Films shot in California
Films shot in Nevada
2018 martial arts films
American sequel films
Films directed by Dimitri Logothetis
2010s English-language films
2010s American films